Davies Escarpment is an east-facing ice escarpment over  long, located southward of Bermel Escarpment in the southern part of the Thiel Mountains of Antarctica. The feature appears to be devoid of rock outcroppings. The name was proposed by Peter F. Bermel and Arthur B. Ford, co-leaders of the United States Geological Survey (USGS) Thiel Mountains party of 1960–61, for William E. Davies, USGS geologist aboard the icebreaker Atka in the Antarctic reconnaissance cruise of 1954–55 in search of station sites for use during the International Geophysical Year.

References 

Escarpments of Antarctica
Landforms of Ellsworth Land